This is a list of listed buildings in the former burgh of Milngavie in East Dunbartonshire, Scotland. Although burghs were abolished for administrative purposes in 1975, Historic Scotland continue to use them and civil parishes for the purposes of geographically categorising listed buildings.

List 

|}

Key

See also 
 List of listed buildings in East Dunbartonshire

Notes

References
 All entries, addresses and coordinates are based on data from Historic Scotland. This data falls under the Open Government Licence

Milngavie
Milngavie